Libertito Pelayo is the founding publisher and editor-in-chief of the Filipino Reporter newspaper in New York City.  Pelayo was educated at Far Eastern University in Manila, Philippines.  An active journalist, Pelayo was formerly a reporter for The Manila Times and was also a correspondent in South Vietnam during the Vietnam War.  He is a member of the New York Press Club, the Asian American Journalists Association, the Filipino American Media Association, and a former member of the United Nations Correspondents Club.  Pelayo was also a former grand marshal for the Philippine Independence Day Committee, Inc. of New York City in 1997.

References

Year of birth missing (living people)
Living people
American male journalists
American newspaper publishers (people)
People from Manila
21st-century Filipino businesspeople
Filipino journalists
American reporters and correspondents
American writers of Filipino descent
Filipino emigrants to the United States
Far Eastern University alumni